Civitella San Paolo is a comune (municipality) in the Metropolitan City of Rome in the Italian region of Lazio, located about  north of Rome.

Physical geography

Territory 
The municipal territory of Civitella San Paolo borders the municipalities of Capena to the south, Fiano Romano to the east, Sant'Oreste and Rignano Flaminio to the west, and Ponzano Romano and Nazzano to the north. It is about forty-five kilometers from Rome, ten from Capena, and seven from Fiano Romano.

The territory, mainly hilly, reaches its maximum altitude with the 288 m of the hill of Monte Cucolo.

References

Cities and towns in Lazio